Montpezat is the name or part of the name of several communes in France:

 Monpezat, commune in the Pyrénées-Atlantiques département 
 Montpezat, Gard, in the Gard département
 Montpezat, Lot-et-Garonne, in the Lot-et-Garonne département
 Montpezat, former commune of the Alpes-de-Haute-Provence  which merged with Montagnac to form Montagnac-Montpezat in January 1974 
 Montpezat, former commune of the Gironde département, now part of Mourens
 Montpezat-de-Quercy, in the Tarn-et-Garonne département
 Montpezat-sous-Bauzon, in the Ardèche département

See also
 Montpézat, in the Gers département

oc:Montmirat